Mutlaq Hamid Al-Thubeiti Al-Otaibi (September 9, 1937 – July 31, 1995) was a Saudi Arabian writer and poet., and he was a member of the faculty of sharia at the University of Umm al-Qura. and he was the President of the Scientific Research Ministry of Higher Education in Saudi Arabia, he is considered by many as one of the greatest Saudi poets of all times.

Life
Al-Thubeiti was born Mutlaq Hamid Al-Thubeiti Al-Otaibi in Taif On September 9, 1937, in 1965 he graduated from the faculty of Sharia Islamic Studies in Mecca, in 1967 he traveled to the United Kingdom where he studied English at the university of manchester, He returned to Saudi Arabia in the 1970s where he got many jobs including member of the faculty of sharia at the University of Umm al-Qura in Mecca. Al-Thubeiti died on July 31, 1995 during his treatment in United States.

Books 
 (The wounds of yesterday)

His Jobs 
Member of Faculty of Shari'a at the University of Umm Al-Qura,
Secretary of Al-Dayra Magazine issued by the King Abdul Aziz in Riyadh
Cultural attaché, Embassy of Saudi Arabia in Sudan
President of the Scientific Research Ministry of Higher Education

References

1937 births
1995 deaths
Saudi Arabian writers
20th-century Saudi Arabian poets
Umm al-Qura University alumni